NGC 634 is a spiral galaxy, lying at a distance of  away from the Milky Way in the northern constellation of Triangulum. This object was discovered back in the nineteenth century by French astronomer Édouard Stephan. It is inclined by an angle of 82.4° to the line of sight from the Earth, and thus is being viewed nearly edge on.

This was most likely a type II supernova and reached magnitude 18.74. Another supernova explosion was reported near the galaxy on January 2, 2008. This event reached a peak magnitude of 16.7 on January 3, and was determined to be a type Iax supernova.

References

External links 
 
 A Perfect Spiral with an Explosive Secret: ESA/Hubble Picture of the week.

NGC 0634
NGC 0634
0634
01164
Discoveries by Édouard Stephan
006059